The River Teviot, or Teviot Water, is a river of the Scottish Borders area of Scotland, and is the largest tributary of the River Tweed by catchment area. The Teviot is an important river for wildlife, especially the Atlantic salmon, but in recent years has witnessed at least four extreme flooding events.

Course

It rises in the western foothills of Comb Hill on the border of Dumfries and Galloway. It flows north-eastwards through Teviotdale and past Teviothead, the Colterscleuch Monument, Broadhaugh, Branxholme and Branxholme Castle.

The Teviot passes through Hawick and Lanton, past the Timpendean Tower and the village of Ancrum, Harestanes and Monteviot, Nisbet and Roxburgh, before joining the River Tweed to the southwest of Kelso.

The Borders Abbeys Way keeps close company with the Teviot on its journey to the Tweed.

Catchment and hydrometry
The river flows across a lowland catchment with shale underlying the surface. The headwaters are mostly moorland, woodland and some hill grazing. More intensively worked land for agriculture is found nearer the eastern end of the river where it flows into the Tweed.

The river is prone to flooding with serious events in Hawick in 2005 when it caused "millions pounds worth of damage", and the river level was recorded at ). Delays to the scheme meant that it wasn't started until 2020, by which time the town was subjected to extreme flooding again when Storm Ciara  hit in January 2020. Flooding was so bad, that one restaurant on the bank of the river collapsed into the floodwaters.

Economy
The river is used by the Borders Whisky Distillery at Hawick for cooling water and processed water. Historically, the river had many mills along its length, and the site of one in Hawick, at Cobel Cauld, is to be used with a reverse Archimedes Screw to generate hydroelectricity. The plan was approved in 2019, with an expected completion date of 2021. The plant is hoped to generate 300 megawatt hours per year; enough to power 100 homes.

Ecology
The river was designated as a site of special scientific interest in 2001. The designation applies to the full length of the river and other tributaries of the River Tweed. The Teviot is noted for its wildlife, including salmon, otters, lamprey and forget-me-nots. The river is an important site for breeding grounds of the Atlantic salmon.

Tributaries 
The principal tributaries of the Teviot are the Allan Water which enters its right bank at Newmill, the Borthwick Water which enters its left bank between Branxholme and Hawick, the Slitrig Water which enters via the right bank in Hawick itself, the Ale Water entering via the left bank at Ancrum, the Jed Water on the right bank just downstream and the Kale Water which enters on the right bank between Crailing and Roxburgh.

See also
 List of places in the Scottish Borders
 List of places in Scotland

References

External links
 Flooding from 2016
 Building collapses into river in 2020

Rivers of the Scottish Borders
Tributaries of the River Tweed
1Teviot